An election to Llanelli Borough Council was held in May 1987. It was preceded by the 1983 election and followed by the 1991 election. On the same day there were elections to the other local authorities and community councils in Wales.

Overview
The Labour Party continued to hold the majority of seats following the election but following the boundary changes a number of seats were lost to other political parties and to Independents.

Boundary Changes
There were wholesale boundary changes and new wards created in place of the previous eleven three-member wards which were abolished.

Results

Bigyn (three seats)

Burry Port (three seats)

Bynea (one seat)

Cross Hands (one seat)

Dafen (two seats)

Elli (two seats)

Felinfoel (one seat)

Glanymor (two seats)

Glyn (one seat)

Hendy (one seat)

Hengoed (two seats)

Kidwelly (one seat)

Llangennech (two seats)

Lliedi (two seats)

Llwynhendy (two seats)

Pembrey (one seat)

Pontyberem (one seat)

Swiss Valley (one seat)

Trimsaran (one seat)

Tumble (two seats)

Tycroes (one seat)

Tyisha (two seats)

References

Llanelli Borough Council elections
Llanelli Borough Council election